The Final Girl Support Group is a horror novel by Grady Hendrix, published  July 13, 2021 by Berkley Books. A television series adaptation has been announced. 

Bloody Disgusting voiced their interest in the novel prior to its release, naming it one of "13 Horror Books We Can’t Wait to Read in 2021".

Synopsis
Lynette Tarkington is one of several women who make up the "Final Girl Support Group", a group of women who survived horrific massacres. Adrienne was a camp counselor who survived a killer who claimed that he was seeking revenge for a nonexistent son. Marilyn was attacked by bloodthirsty cannibals. Dani's brother Nick escaped from a mental asylum and on Halloween, slaughtered anyone who stood between him and his sister. Julia was left a final girl after her boyfriend and one of his friends decided to turn her into a final girl, and Heather had to face a "Dream Killer". Lynette herself had to deal with a situation dubbed the "Silent Night Slayings" by the media. Their experiences left a lasting impact on their lives that has endured into their later adulthood. 

Lynette is barely hanging on, as she spends her time outside of group sequestered in her apartment. The others are seemingly not much better in their lives, as the infamy and subsequent movie series about their experiences have made moving on difficult. The support group is one of the only things in her life that makes Lynette able to leave the safety of her apartment. When Adrienne is found murdered in her home Lynette is certain that someone is out to finish the work that their respective killers failed at: to kill all of the final girls once and for all.

Development 
While writing the book Hendrix chose not to read other books centered on final girls, as he did not want to be influenced. He completed a first draft of the novel in 2014, but was unable to sell the manuscript due to Riley Sager announcing that he would be penning the novel Final Girls. Hendrix has stated that he was glad the novel did not sell, as he later re-wrote the second half of the novel as "I was sticking the landing, but I was sticking a C-minus landing." In an interview he also stated that he wrote The Final Girl Support Group as a standalone novel, with no intent for a sequel.

Release

The Final Girl Support Group was released in hardback and ebook formats on July 13, 2021 through Berkley. An audiobook adaptation narrated by Friday the 13th actress Adrienne King was simultaneously released via W.F. Howes, an RBmedia company and Penguin Random House Audio.

Adaptation
Adaptation rights were optioned prior to the book's release date by Annapurna Pictures, with the intention to turn the novel into a television series. Per Deadline, Elizabeth Craft and Sarah Fain will serve as screenwriters while Grady Hendrix will executive produce with Megan Ellison, Sue Naegle, Patrick Chu, and Adam Goldworm.

Reception
Critical reception has been positive. USA Today gave the novel 3/4 stars, writing that "It’s a thin and bloody line that separates horror fun from the truly horrific, and Grady has a lot of fun walking it as he writes his final girls a triumphant conclusion rarely afforded survivors in real life." The AV Club praised the novel's tension, as they felt that the "wicked pleasure of Hendrix’s book comes from just how effectively he sets up the life-or-death stakes of Lynnette’s situation—and how clearly outmatched her and the other women seem to be."

References

External links
 

2020s horror novels
2021 American novels
Books by Grady Hendrix
Berkley Books books